Rhyssoplax stangeri is a species of chiton in the family Chitonidae.

References
 Powell A. W. B., New Zealand Mollusca, William Collins Publishers Ltd, Auckland, New Zealand 1979 

Chitonidae
Chitons of New Zealand
Chitons described in 1847